Choe Hyong-gil (born 11 September 1976) is a former North Korean diver. He competed in the men's 10 metre platform events at the 1996, 2000 and 2004 Summer Olympics.

References

External links

1976 births
Living people
Divers at the 1996 Summer Olympics
Divers at the 2000 Summer Olympics
Divers at the 2004 Summer Olympics
North Korean male divers
Olympic divers of North Korea
Divers at the 1998 Asian Games
Asian Games competitors for North Korea